Janes Rejoice is a Danish-based group, formed in 1987–88 around the pop rock folk songs of singer-songwriter Søren Nørregaard.

Albums
 Views to Keep – 1988
 Flaming Flamingo – 1989
 Spins – 1992
 Afterglow – 1999
 Totem – 2006 
 Eleven Rhymes – 2012
 Sky Six Shack Seven – 2019

References 

http://rateyourmusic.com/artist/janes_rejoice

External links
Billboard.com

Danish musical groups